The Victa R-2 was a prototype Australian single-engine four-seat light aircraft built by Victa Ltd in the early 1960s. A single example was built, first flying in February 1961, but no production followed.

Design and development

In September 1959, the Australian engineering company Victa Consolidated Industries, a major manufacturer of motor lawnmowers, established an aviation department. The first intended product was the Victa R-2, a four-seat single-engine light aircraft designed by Luigi Pellarini. Pellarini's design was a low-winged, all metal tractor configuration monoplane with a T-tail, powered by a  Lycoming O-360 flat-four piston engine driving a constant-speed propeller. The prototype's wings were braced by struts, although production aircraft may have had fully cantilever wings. The wingtips and tail were raked to reduce drag. A retractable tricycle landing gear was fitted, although the production of versions with fixed landing gear was considered for operations in the bush.

A prototype first flew on 15 February 1961, by which time Victa had received several orders for the R-2. Despite these orders, no production followed. Victa had committed to production of the two-seat Airtourer (which had been ordered in much larger numbers than the R-2), and chose to develop a four-seater derivative of the Airtrainer, the Aircruiser, which was expected to be cheaper to build than the R-2, instead of continuing to develop the R-2. Pellarini left Victa, and later went on to design the Transavia PL-12 Airtruk agricultural biplane, although attempts by Pellarini to build a development of the R-2 as the Transavia PL-13 were unsuccessful.

Specifications (Performance estimated)

References

External links
Victa R-2 Aircraft

1960s Australian civil utility aircraft
Aircraft first flown in 1961